Kazimirov kazneni korpus / Profili profili is the first and only studio release by the Serbian  minimalist / experimental music bands Profili Profili and Kazimirov Kazneni Korpus, recorded and released in March 1982. This split album, released by Galerija Srecna nova umetnost SKC, is the first former Yugoslav album, released under an independent record label.

Background 
During early 1982, the two bands featuring the same lineup, Profili Profili and Kazimirov Kazneni Korpus, performed at the Ljubljana band Laibach art exhibition, at the gallery of the Belgrade SKC. At the performance, the band made a decision to record the material they have been performing, and within the following three days, the band worked at the Banovo Brdo NGM studio. The album recording cost the band 15.000 Yugoslav dinars, which was rated the album a low-budget release, and was released under the independent record label Galerija Srecna nova umetnost SKC, making it the first independent music release in Yugoslavia. Kazimirov Kazneni Korpus / Profili Profili, released in March 1982, featured five versions of the Profili Profili song "Ventilatori" ("Ventilators"), and five versions of the Kazimirov Kazneni Korpus song "Paranoidno šizoidne devojke" ("Paranoid schizophrenic girls"). Originally released in a hundred copies, with each copy having a different album cover, soon after the release went out of print, and in the following month the band released a hundred more copies, which were quickly sold out. Today the album is considered a rarity and a collector's item.

Track listing

Kazimirov Kazneni Korpus (side A)

Profili Profili (side B)

Personnel 
 Miodrag "Čeza" Stojanović (bass guitar, vocals)
 Slobodan "Jela" Jeličić (guitar, vocals)
 Dragoslav "Draža" Radojković (drums)
 Milan Mladenović (bass guitar)

References 
 EX YU ROCK enciklopedija 1960-2006,  Janjatović Petar;  
 Prvih 100 kaseta; Kazimirov Kazneni Korpus / Profili Profili SKC album review, Petar Popović, Džuboks magazine, April 1982
 Drugom stranom, Almanah novog talasa u SFRJ, Janjatović Petar; 1983

1982 albums
Kazimirov Kazneni Korpus albums
Profili Profili albums
Split albums